Lazgireh (also Romanized as Lāzgīreh; also known as Lārīzeh and Lāzīreh) is a village in Sepiddasht Rural District, Papi District, Khorramabad County, Lorestan Province, Iran. At the 2006 census, its population was 47, in 6 families.

References 

Towns and villages in Khorramabad County